Owen Robertson Cheatham (1902–1970) was an American businessman. He founded Georgia-Pacific, a formerly publicly traded corporation on the New York Stock Exchange from 1949 to 2005, now a subsidiary of Koch Industries.

Biography

Early life
Owen Robertson Cheatham was born on July 9, 1902, in Concord, Campbell County, Virginia. He attended New Concord Presbyterian Church in Concord.

Career
In 1927, he founded the Georgia Hardwood Lumber Co., (now known as Georgia-Pacific), a wholesaler of hardwood lumber headquartered in Augusta, Georgia. It was a publicly traded corporation on the New York Stock Exchange from 1949 to 2005. Under his tenure, it became a $750 million enterprise with a $1 billion+ asset base. It is now a subsidiary of Koch Industries.

Personal life
He was married to Celeste Wickliffe Cheatham. She collected thirty-seven pieces of Dalí-Jewels, which were exhibited at the Virginia Museum of Fine Arts in Richmond, Virginia after her death. He died on October 24, 1970. He was buried in the New Concord Presbyterian Church Cemetery.

Legacy
The Owen R. Cheatham Memorial Garden and Monument on the grounds of the New Concord Presbyterian Church in Concord, Virginia, is named after him. The dedication of the garden took place on Sunday June 3, 1973.

The Owen Robertson Cheatham Gallery at Dartmouth College in Hanover, New Hampshire is named in his honor.

Cheatham Grove, a stand of old growth Redwood trees in California's Grizzly Creek Redwoods State Park, is named for him. The land, part of Georgia Pacific's larger timber holdings in the area, was donated to the state by Owen Cheatham in 1945.

References

1902 births
1970 deaths
People from Campbell County, Virginia
Dartmouth College people
Georgia-Pacific
20th-century American businesspeople